The Chicopee Falls Dam is a masonry stone dam that parallels Route 33 (Bridge Street) in Chicopee, Massachusetts. It is part of the Chicopee River Watershed. The dam was constructed in the late 19th century, and is owned by the City of Chicopee. It impounds the waters of the Chicopee River at Chicopee Falls, to form the Chicopee Reservoir.

This is the third-to-last dam on the Chicopee River before it empties into the Connecticut River just north of Springfield.

Flash-boards have been installed to raise the level of the impoundment above the original height of the dam. Therefore, the dam's effective height is greater than the  shown in its specifications.

References
Massachusetts water resources

Buildings and structures in Chicopee, Massachusetts
Dams in Massachusetts
Masonry dams